The 1961 Isle of Man TT races, the fourth round of the 1961 Grand Prix motorcycle racing season, involved five races on the Isle of Man TT Mountain Course on the Isle of Man. Three of the races were won by Mike Hailwood. He completed the six laps of the course in 2 hours, 15 minutes and 2.0 seconds at an average race speed of 100.61 mph to win the Senior TT race, after earlier winning the Ultra-Lightweight 125cc and Lightweight 250cc races Phil Read won the 350cc Junior TT race, while Max Deubel and E.Hoerner won the Sidecar TT event.

1961 Isle of Man Lightweight TT 125cc final standings
3 Laps (113.00 Miles) Mountain Course.

1961 Sidecar TT final standings
3 Laps (113.00 Miles) Mountain Course.

1961 Isle of Man Lightweight TT 250cc final standings
5 Laps (188.65 Miles) Mountain Course.

1961 Isle of Man Junior TT 350cc final standings
6 Laps (236.38 Miles) Mountain Course.

1961 Isle of Man Senior TT 500cc final standings
6 Laps (236.38 Miles) Mountain Course.

References

External links
 Detailed race results
 Mountain Course map

Isle of Man Tt
Tourist Trophy
Isle of Man TT
Isle of Man TT